The shortfin smooth lanternshark (Etmopterus joungi) is a shark of the family Etmopteridae found off the northeastern coast of Taiwan, at depths of between 430 and 550 m.

References

Etmopterus
Taxa named by James D. S. Knuckey
Taxa named by David A. Ebert
Taxa named by George H. Burgess
Fish described in 2011